Plasmodium morulum is a parasite of the genus Plasmodium.

Like all Plasmodium species P. morulum has both vertebrate and insect hosts. The vertebrate hosts for this parasite are reptiles.

Description 
This species was first described by Telford in 2007.

Geographical occurrence 
This species is found in Panama.

Vectors
Not known.

Clinical features and host pathology 
This species infects the lizard Mabuya mabouya.

References 

morulum